Elections to The Moray Council were held on 3 May 2007, the same day as the Scottish Parliament election. The election was the first using the eight new wards created under the Local Governance (Scotland) Act 2004. 26 councillors were elected. Each ward elected either 3 or 4 members, using the STV electoral system. Previously there were single-member wards which used the first past the post electoral system. The election resulted in a previously Independent council becoming an Independent/Conservative coalition, with a majority of four. An SNP victory in a subsequent by-election held in February 2008 had reduced the Independent/Conservative majority to 2 seats.

Election summary

Ward results

By-elections since 2007

On 14 February 2008, a by-election was held for the Elgin City South ward, after the death of Cllr A G K Bisset (Independent).

On 11 November 2010, a by-election was held for the Forres ward, after the retirement of Cllr Iain Young (Conservative).

References

External links
Election Results, Moray Council
Election Results, BBC

2007
2007 Scottish local elections
21st century in Moray